The Council of European Energy Regulators (CEER) is a non-profit organisation in which Europe's national energy regulators voluntarily cooperate to protect consumer interests and to facilitate the creation of a single, competitive and sustainable internal market for gas and electricity in Europe.

Foundation and mission
In March 2000, ten national energy regulatory authorities voluntarily signed a "Memorandum of Understanding" for the establishment of the Council of European Energy Regulators (CEER). CEER's objective is to facilitate cooperation among Europe's energy regulators in promoting a single-EU electricity and gas market. In 2003 the CEER was formally established as a "not-for-profit association" under Belgian law, with its own Brussels-based Secretariat. CEER represents 30 Members - the national energy regulators from the EU Member States, Iceland, Norway and Great Britain as CEER Members, and the regulators of Albania, Bosnia and Herzegovina, Georgia, Kosovo, Moldova, Montenegro, Republic of North Macedonia, Republic of Serbia and the Swiss Confederation as Observers.

CEER works closely with the Agency for the Cooperation of Energy Regulators (ACER).  ACER is a European Community body with legal personality. ACER became fully operational on 3 March 2011. Its seat is in Ljubljana, Slovenia.

Objectives and functions
CEER seeks to facilitate the creation of a single, competitive, efficient and sustainable market for gas and electricity in Europe.

Some other objectives:
facilitate consultation, coordination and cooperation of national regulatory authorities, contributing to a consistent application of legislation in all Member States;
set up co-operation, information exchange and assistance amongst regulators;
contribute to the advancement of research on regulatory issues
operate a training academy for energy regulators

CEER acts as a platform for cooperation, information exchange and assistance between national energy regulators and is their interface at European level with the EU Institutions.

CEER establishes expert views for discussion with the European Commission (in particular DG Energy) and seeks to provide the necessary elements for the development of regulation in the fields of electricity and gas.

CEER also strives to share regulatory experience worldwide through its links with similar regional energy regulatory associations.

Members
CEER membership is open to the national energy regulatory authorities of the European Union and the European Economic Area (EEA).  The CEER now has 30 Members, including energy regulators in the 27 EU-Member States plus Iceland, Norway and Great Britain - as well as nine Observers - the energy regulators from Albania, Bosnia and Herzegovina, Georgia, Kosovo, Moldova, Montenegro, Republic of North Macedonia, Republic of Serbia and the Swiss Confederation.

See also
 Agency for the Cooperation of Energy Regulators (ACER)
 European Regulators' Group for Electricity and Gas (ERGEG)
  Energy Regulators Regional Association (ERRA)
 EURELECTRIC
 Nord Pool

References

 About-Section on the website of the European Energy Regulators
 CEER founding Statutes

External links
 CEER website

Non-profit organisations based in Belgium
Organizations established in 2000
Energy in Europe
Energy markets
International energy organizations
Energy regulatory authorities
Regulation in the European Union